K2 is an Italian free-to-air television channel owned by Warner Bros. Discovery EMEA, a division of Warner Bros. Discovery for children between 4 and 14 years of age. Its registered office is in Rome. It launched on 1 October 2004 as a syndicated television strand.

History
K2 was launched on 1 October 2004 as an analogue-based block from 5pm to 7pm, which was syndicated in other Italian regional television stations, replacing Fox Kids in the process during its rebrand into Jetix. In 2009, it was launched as its own digital terrestrial television channel.

Due to Disney's decision to rebrand the Jetix Europe operation under the Disney XD brand umbrella, the Italian subsidiary of Jetix Europe, Jetix Italy S.r.l., bought the Italian Jetix network, renamed itself as Switchover Media, agreed to let the Jetix Italy channel rebrand itself to Disney XD Italy, and purchased K-2 and GXT from Jetix Europe in June 2009.

In this period 2 channels popped up, K2 Extra and K2 Plus, however, they were just copies of the original channel and were removed in December 2012.

With the acquisition of Switchover Media in January 2013 by Discovery Communications, K2 began to be managed by Discovery EMEA.

On May 17, 2021, AT&T and Discovery, Inc. reached a definitive Reverse Morris Trust agreement, in which WarnerMedia would spin out from AT&T as an independent company that in turn will acquire Discovery's assets. The $43-billion cash/securities/stock transaction, which will include the retention of certain existing WarnerMedia debt, is expected to be finalized by April 8, 2022. Upon completion, K2 and all other assets of Discovery would be combined with the WarnerMedia assets (such as Adult Swim, Boomerang, Cartoon Network, HBO, Cinemax, CNN and more). AT&T shareholders will own 71% of the company's stock and Discovery shareholders will own the remaining 29% share; Discovery President/CEO David Zaslav will be appointed to head the new company, replacing WarnerMedia CEO Jason Kilar.

In April 2022, the merger between WarnerMedia and Discovery, Inc. was completed, forming Warner Bros. Discovery, and K2 was transferred to Warner Bros. Discovery EMEA as part of it.

Programs 
The channel is programmed for 4-14-year-olds, airing mostly children shows like Alvin and the Chipmunks, Oggy and the Cockroaches, Zig & Sharko and Total Dramarama. During 10:00pm and 1:00am along with its sister channel Frisbee it airs a block called Family Club, with educational shows taken from Discovery other channels like How It's Made and How Do They Do It?. During the night instead, it airs French recent shows taken off from the daily schedule, such as The Daltons and Mr. Magoo. On the weekends it airs Pokémon marathons and Total Drama. Whenever movies are aired (mostly on Mondays), they're repeated on Saturday at 1.00pm and Sunday at 9.00am.

Movies
From 2011 to 2013, the channel broadcast movies from  the pre-2004 Metro-Goldwyn-Mayer library and DIC Entertainment and then from 2014 to 2021 movies from DreamWorks Animation and Universal Pictures.

Advertising 
The channel's current advertising is managed by PRS Media Group.

References

External links
  (in Italian)

Children's television networks
Television channels in Italy
Television syndication distributors
Italian-language television stations
Television channels and stations established in 2003
Former subsidiaries of The Walt Disney Company
Warner Bros. Discovery EMEA